Santos "San" Padilla Ferrer (February 26, 1957 – August 4, 2007) was a Puerto Rican politician and mayor of the city of Cabo Rojo, Puerto Rico.

Padilla was a member of the New Progressive Party of Puerto Rico (Partido Nuevo Progresista de Puerto Rico), or PNP.  The party and its members support statehood for Puerto Rico within the United States.

Padilla died following a massive heart attack on August 4, 2007 in Cabo Rojo.  The governor of Puerto Rico, Aníbal Acevedo Vilá, declared three days of national mourning.

References

Mayors of places in Puerto Rico
New Progressive Party (Puerto Rico) politicians
1957 births
2007 deaths
People from Cabo Rojo, Puerto Rico
20th-century American politicians